Baizongia is a genus of true bugs belonging to the family Aphididae.

The species of this genus are found in Eurasia.

Species:
 Baizongia pistaciae (Linnaeus, 1767)

References

Aphididae
Hemiptera genera